KWPW (107.9 FM, "Power 108") is a radio station broadcasting a contemporary hit radio format. Licensed to Robinson, Texas, United States, the station serves the Waco area.  The station is currently owned by Bill McCutcheon.  Its studios are located in Waco, and its transmitter is located in Waco near the VA Hospital.

History
The station began in 1972 as KCIR in Corsicana Texas. The call letters stood for "The Golden 'CIR'cle". It was assigned the call letters KXCL-FM on April 12, 1983.  On February 1, 1985, the station changed its call sign to KAND-FM, matching the AM sister station on 1340. After its purchase by Marcos A. Rodriguez in 1994, the call sign was changed on January 19 to KICI-FM, then again on February 20, 1998 to KDXX-FM. In 2001, KDXX applied for and was granted a move from Corsicana to better serve Waco, Texas. It was relicensed to Robinson, Texas as it is currently. On January 11, 2002 the calls changed to KDOS, on April 30, 2005 to KHCK, and on August 27, 2010 to the current KWPW.

KWPW-HD2
On August 7, 2017, KWPW launched a Spanish CHR format on its HD2 subchannel, branded as "Latino 93.5" (simulcast on FM translator K228FK 93.5 FM Waco).

References

External links

Contemporary hit radio stations in the United States
WPW
Radio stations established in 1983